Karl Åke Nilsson (12 December 1937 – 31 October 2005) was a Swedish sprint canoeist who competed in the early 1960s. At the 1960 Summer Olympics in Rome, he was eliminated in the repechages of the K-1 4 × 500 m event.

References

1937 births
2005 deaths
Swedish male canoeists
Olympic canoeists of Sweden
Canoeists at the 1960 Summer Olympics
People from Nyköping Municipality
Sportspeople from Södermanland County